Arthur Longbottom may refer to:

 Arthur Longbottom (politician) (1883–1943), British Labour Party politician, Member of Parliament for Halifax 1928–1931
 Arthur Longbottom (footballer) (born 1933), footballer with Queens Park Rangers